William Boon (1892 – 24 April 1918) was an Australian rules footballer for the Port Adelaide Football Club in the South Australian Football League. Boon was killed whilst serving Australia in Maricourt, France during World War I.

References

Port Adelaide Football Club (SANFL) players
Port Adelaide Football Club players (all competitions)
Australian military personnel killed in World War I
1892 births
1918 deaths